George Logan may refer to:
George Logan (Pennsylvania politician) (1753–1821), American physician and U.S. senator for Pennsylvania
George Washington Logan (1815–1889), North Carolina politician and Confederate Congress member
George Logan (soccer) (c. 1933–2009), collegiate head soccer coach
George Logan (minister) (1678–1755), Scottish minister and controversialist
George Logan (Australian politician) (1884–1953), member of the Queensland Legislative Assembly
George Logan (Connecticut politician), member of the Connecticut State Senate
Evadne Hinge, of Hinge and Bracket, a stage name for George Logan (born 1944), British performer
George Pettit (born 1982), also known as George Logan, vocalist in the band Alexisonfire
George Logan, a fictional character from Scary Movie 3